Henry Rosenstein (June 16, 1920 – February 27, 2010) was an American professional basketball player. Born in Brooklyn, New York, Rosenstein attended City College of New York before starring in AAU Basketball and being named MVP in the Eastern Jewish Center League in 1942–43. He became a member of the New York Knicks of the Basketball Association of America in 1946, playing with them in what is now considered the first NBA game, played in Toronto on November 1, 1946. On January 26, 1947, Rosenstein was sold to the Providence Steamrollers.

After the end of his stint with the Steamrollers, Rosenstein played for five seasons with the Scranton Miners of the American Basketball League, playing on their championship teams in 1949–50 and 1950–51. In the latter year he led the team in scoring.

Ronstein was Coach of the New York Tapers of the AAU National Industrial Basketball League in 1960–1961.

Rosenstein was inducted into the National Jewish Sports Hall of Fame on March 29, 1998. He died of heart failure on February 27, 2010, in Boca Raton, Florida.

BAA career statistics

Regular season

References

External links
 The first NBA game
 National Jewish Sports Hall of Fame

1920 births
2010 deaths
Amateur Athletic Union men's basketball players
American men's basketball players
Basketball players from New York City
Boys High School (Brooklyn) alumni
City College of New York alumni
Eastern Basketball Association coaches
Forwards (basketball)
Jewish men's basketball players
New York Knicks players
Providence Steamrollers players
Sportspeople from Brooklyn